Lu Xiaoxin (born 22 February 1989) is a Chinese athlete specialising in the discus throw. She competed at the 2015 World Championships in Beijing without qualifying for the final.
 
Her personal best in the event is 63.27 metres set in Shenyang in 2013.

Competition record

References

Chinese female discus throwers
Living people
Place of birth missing (living people)
1989 births
World Athletics Championships athletes for China
Athletes (track and field) at the 2014 Asian Games
Athletes (track and field) at the 2016 Summer Olympics
Olympic athletes of China
Asian Games medalists in athletics (track and field)
Asian Games silver medalists for China
Medalists at the 2014 Asian Games
21st-century Chinese women